The Coalition for Religious Freedom is a religious right organization founded by Tim LaHaye and Robert Grant to lobby against government regulation of religion.  In the 1980s the organization concentrated its efforts on defending the Unification Church.

See also
Christian right
Left Behind series
Christian eschatology
Prophecy
Dispensationalism
Covenant theology
Christian Voice
American Freedom Coalition

External links
Christianity Today: With Their Leader in Prison, Moonies Pursue Legitimacy

Political organizations based in the United States
Conservative organizations in the United States